The fifth season of The Voice Brasil, premiered on Rede Globo on October 5, 2016 in the 10:30 p.m. (BRT/AMT) slot immediately following the primetime telenovela A Lei do Amor.

The show is again hosted by Tiago Leifert, with Mariana Rios serving as backstage host. Lulu Santos, Carlinhos Brown, Claudia Leitte and Michel Teló returned as the coaches, with Ivete Sangalo appearing as guest mentor during the battle rounds.

Mylena Jardim, a 17-year-old R&B singer from Belo Horizonte, won the competition on December 29, 2016 with 34% of the final vote, making her the youngest winner so far and Michel Teló the first coach to win the show twice (and for two consecutive times).

Teams
 Key

Blind auditions
Key

Episode 1 (Oct. 5)

Episode 2 (Oct. 13)

Episode 3 (Oct. 20)

Episode 4 (Oct. 27)

Episode 5 (Nov. 3)

The Battles
The Battles round started with episode 6 and ended with episode 8 (broadcast from November 9 to November 24, 2016). The coaches can steal two losing artists from another coach. Contestants who win their battle or are stolen by another coach will advance to the Live Coaches' Battle.

Key

Live shows
The Live shows are the final phase of the competition. It consists of the coaches' battle, two weekly shows and the season finale.

Viewers in the Amazon time zone (Acre, Amazonas, Rondônia and Roraima) are cued to vote to save artists on the show's official website during the delayed broadcast.

Artist's info

Result details

Elimination chart

Key

Week 1

Live Coaches' Battle 1

  Rafah returned to the competition in week three due to graphics error in which incorrect voting numbers were displayed on screen during his Coaches' Battle performance.

Week 2

Live Coaches' Battle 2

Week 3

Remix

Week 4

Semifinals

Week 5

Finals

Ratings and reception

Brazilian ratings
All numbers are in points and provided by IBOPE.

 In 2016, each point represents 69.417 households in São Paulo.

References

External links
Official website on Globo.com

5
2016 Brazilian television seasons